These are the Billboard magazine Dance/Mix Show Airplay number-one hits of 2014. from January 4 to November 29, 2014, the chart featured 25 titles. It was expanded to 40 titles effective with the December 6, 2014 issue.

Note that Billboard publishes charts with an issue date approximately 7–10 days in advance.

Number-One Singles

See also
2014 in music
List of Mainstream Top 40 number-one hits of 2014 (U.S.)
List of Billboard Rhythmic number-one songs of the 2010s
List of number-one dance singles of 2014 (U.S.)
List of number-one Dance/Electronic Songs of 2014 (U.S.)

References

External links
BDS Dance Airplay Chart (updated weekly)

2014
United States Dance Airplay